Stortoni is an Italian surname. Notable people with the surname include:

 Bernardo Stortoni (born 1976), Argentine rugby union player
 Simone Stortoni (born 1985), Italian cyclist

Italian-language surnames